Robert Seligman (born 1 May 1986) is a Croatian artistic gymnast.

In 2018, he won the silver medal in the pommel horse event at the 2018 European Men's Artistic Gymnastics Championships held in Glasgow, Scotland, United Kingdom.

In 2020, he competed at the 2020 European Men's Artistic Gymnastics Championships held in Mersin, Turkey. He finished in 4th place in the vault event.

References

External links 
 

Living people
Place of birth missing (living people)
Croatian male artistic gymnasts
Medalists at the 2005 Summer Universiade
Universiade medalists in gymnastics
Mediterranean Games competitors for Croatia
Competitors at the 2013 Mediterranean Games
Competitors at the 2018 Mediterranean Games
Universiade gold medalists for Croatia
1986 births
Mediterranean Games silver medalists for Croatia
Mediterranean Games medalists in gymnastics
21st-century Croatian people